Southern Arizona Community Academy (SACA) is a charter high school located in Tucson, Arizona. It opened in the 1999–2000 school year. SACA's enrollment is between 180 and 240 students. Students may earn a high school diploma through an accelerated, career-focused program.

Educational model 
Southern Arizona Community Academy is a nontraditional high school. SACA has two library-setting classrooms — the West Classroom, which focuses on languages and social studies, and the East Classroom, which focuses on mathematics, science, and technology. Upon enrollment, students are placed into courses based on individual needs. Courses are self-paced, so students may start or finish a course at any time. Students are always able to receive one-on-one attention from instructors.

Special courses 
In May 2006, Southern Arizona Community Academy became the first and only high school Microsoft IT Academy in Arizona. Students can take many classes including: Microsoft Word 2007, Microsoft Excel 2007, Microsoft PowerPoint 2007, Microsoft Outlook 2007, Microsoft Access 2007, and Windows Vista. After a student takes the Microsoft course, students make take the certification exam, which is paid for by the academy. Because SACA is also a Certiport Testing Center, students may become Microsoft certified on campus. Students also have the opportunity to earn college credit while attending SACA. The school pays for students to take classes through Pima Community College.

Clubs and groups 
SACA participates in many different activities including:

 American Scholastic Mathematics Association Mathematics Competition
 Arizona Stock Market Simulation
 Future Problem Solving Program International
 Odyssey of the Mind
 Chess Club
 Creative Writing Seminar
 Digital Yearbook
 Fellowship of Christian Athletes
 Holocaust Seminar
 National Honor Society
 Spanish Club

Sports programs 
SACA offers the following sports:
 Flag Football
 Boys' Basketball
 Girls' Basketball
 Soccer

References

External links 
 SACAeagles.com
 Arizona State Board of Charter Schools
 Arizona State Board of Education
 Microsoft IT Academy Program
 Certiport Testing Center
 Pima Community College
 American Scholastic Mathematics Association
 Arizona Stock Market Simulation
 Arizona Odyssey of the Mind
 Arizona Future Problem Solving Program

Charter schools in Arizona
Schools in Tucson, Arizona
Public high schools in Arizona